Quercetagetin is a flavonol, a type of flavonoid. It can be found in the genus Eriocaulon.

Glycosides
Quercetagetin-6-O-β-D-glucopyranoside from Tagetes mandonii.

References

Flavonols
Catechols
Pyrogallols